This article lists all episodes of the Disney Junior TV series Fancy Nancy based on the eponymous 2005-launched children's picture book series by Jane O'Connor; illustrated by Robin Preiss Glasser.

Disney Junior renewed the series for a second season prior to the series premiere in the United States on July 13, 2018 and in Canada the following day. Disney Junior renewed the series for a second time ahead of the second season premiere on October 4, 2019 in the United States. That began simulcast on Disney Junior in the U.S. and Canada and Disney+ around the globe on November 12, 2021. The third season would turn out to be the last/final according to series developer Krista Tucker on her LinkedIn profile, which was picked up by dedicated country-wide news outlets as a "series cancellation" and not a series finale.

Series overview

Episodes
All episodes in the series were directed by Jamie Mitchell and Mircea Kyle Mantta.

Season 1 (2018–19)

Season 2 (2019–21)

Season 3 (2021–22)

Shorts

Fancy It Yourself (Season 1)

Fancy It Yourself (Season 2)

References

Lists of American children's animated television series episodes